This is a list of Members of Parliament (MPs) elected to the House of Commons at the 2005 general election, held on 5 May. The list is arranged by constituency. New MPs elected since the general election and changes in party allegiance are noted at the bottom of the page.

During the 2005–2010 Parliament, Michael Martin and John Bercow served as Speaker of the Commons, Lady Hayman served as Lord Speaker, Tony Blair and Gordon Brown served as Prime Minister, and Michael Howard and David Cameron served as Leader of the Opposition. This Parliament was dissolved on 12 April 2010.

Composition of the 2005–2010 UK Parliament
These representative diagrams show the composition of the parties in Parliament. The first show the composition immediately after the 2005 general election, and the second shows the composition before the 2010 general election.

Note: The Scottish National Party and Plaid Cymru sit together as a party group, while Sinn Féin has not taken its seats. This is not the official seating plan of the House of Commons, which has five rows of benches on each side, with the government party to the right of the Speaker and opposition parties to the left, but with room for only around two-thirds of MPs to sit at any one time.

Note: The effective Government majority is higher than the notional majority, because MPs from Sinn Féin do not take their seats due to their long-standing policy of abstentionism and vacant seats have no vote. Technically, the speakers belong to parties in a notional majority, though they do not usually vote and therefore don't figure in an effective majority.

List of MPs elected in the general election
The following table is a list of MPs elected on 5 May 2005, ordered by constituency. The previous MP and previous party column shows the MP and party holding the seat at dissolution on 11 April 2005.

Note that most Scottish constituency boundaries were considerably changed from the previous general election, due to a decrease in the number of Scottish seats from 72 to 59. In this case, the previous MPs cannot be shown, and the previous party column shows the notional winner of the new seat, based on analysis of the 2001 general election result.

Key to changes since general election:
a = change in party allegiance
b = by-election



Postponed poll

 South Staffordshire - due to the death of a candidate standing both for parliament and a seat on the local council after some of the postal votes had been received, the elections in this constituency were postponed until 23 June 2005. Sir Patrick Cormack (Conservative), the incumbent Member of Parliament, retained his seat with an increased majority.

By-elections

2005
 14 July: Cheadle — Mark Hunter (Lib Dem), to replace Patsy Calton (Lib Dem) who died on 29 May.
 29 September: Livingston — Jim Devine (Lab), to replace Robin Cook (Lab) who died on 6 August.

2006
 9 February: Dunfermline and West Fife — Willie Rennie (Lib Dem), to replace Rachel Squire (Lab), who died on 5 January.
 29 June: Blaenau Gwent — Dai Davies (Ind), to replace Peter Law (Ind) who died on 25 April.
 29 June: Bromley and Chislehurst — Bob Neill (Con), to replace Eric Forth (Con) who died on 17 May.

2007
 19 July: Ealing Southall — Virendra Sharma (Lab) to replace Piara Khabra (Lab) who died on 19 June.
 19 July: Sedgefield — Phil Wilson (Lab) to replace Tony Blair (Lab), who resigned to take up a new role as Middle East Envoy.

2008
 22 May: Crewe and Nantwich — Edward Timpson (Con) to replace Gwyneth Dunwoody (Lab) who died on 17 April.
 26 June: Henley — John Howell (Con) to replace Boris Johnson (Con), who resigned after being elected Mayor of London.
 10 July: Haltemprice and Howden — David Davis (Con) resigned and successfully stood for re-election, in protest over the Government's policy of detaining terror suspects for up to 42 days without charge.
 24 July: Glasgow East — John Mason (SNP) to replace David Marshall (Lab) who resigned due to ill health.
 6 November: Glenrothes — Lindsay Roy (Lab) to replace John MacDougall (Lab), who died on 13 August.

2009
 23 July: Norwich North - Chloe Smith (Con) to replace Ian Gibson (Lab), who resigned after a Labour Party panel prohibited him from standing for re-election.
 12 November: Glasgow North East - Willie Bain (Lab) to replace  Michael Martin (Speaker), who resigned during the 2009 expenses scandal.

Other changes

2006
Clare Short (Birmingham Ladywood) — resigned the Labour whip on 20 October 2006 and became Independent Labour.

2007
Quentin Davies (Grantham and Stamford) — defected from Conservative to Labour on 26 June.
Bob Wareing (Liverpool West Derby) — resigned the Labour whip and became an Independent from 16 September 2007.
Andrew Pelling (Croydon Central) — suspended from Conservative party and sat as an Independent Conservative from 18 September 2007, and as an Independent from October 2008.

2008
Derek Conway (Old Bexley and Sidcup) — Conservative whip withdrawn on 29 January after allegations of corruption.
Bob Spink (Castle Point) — resigned the Conservative whip on 12 March 2008; joined the UKIP on 21 April 2008, and later designated as "independent" (as UKIP had no whip in Parliament).

2009
John Bercow (Buckingham) — Conservative elected Speaker on 22 June.
David Taylor (North West Leicestershire) died on 26 December, seat vacant at dissolution.

2010
Iris Robinson (Strangford) — resigned her seat on 18 January, seat vacant at dissolution.
David Chaytor (Bury North) — Labour whip suspended on 8 February due to criminal charges over the expenses scandal.
Jim Devine (Livingston — Labour whip suspended on 8 February due to criminal charges over the expenses scandal.
Elliot Morley (Scunthorpe) — Labour whip suspended on 8 February due to criminal charges over the expenses scandal.
Ashok Kumar (Middlesbrough South and East Cleveland) died on 15 March, seat vacant at dissolution.
Sylvia Hermon (North Down) — resigned from the Ulster Unionist Party on 25 March in order to stand as an independent candidate in the forthcoming general election.

See also
 Results of the 2005 United Kingdom general election
 Members of the House of Lords
 List of MPs for Northern Ireland
 List of MPs for Scotland
 List of MPs for England
 List of MPs for Wales

References

External links
Find out about your MP and how they have voted with The Guardian
How Parliament's size has varied over the centuries

 
2005
Lists of UK MPs 2005–2010
UK MPs